Shady Glen is an unincorporated community in Knox Township, Jefferson County, Ohio, United States.

References

Unincorporated communities in Jefferson County, Ohio